Samma himmel is the debut studio album by Molly Sandén, released in 2009.

Track listing

Charts

References

2009 debut albums
Molly Sandén albums